Jere Koponen (born 23 May 1992 in Turku) is a Finnish football goalkeeper for Turun Palloseura.

Career
Koponen started his career at FC Inter Turku and won the Finnish U19 championship with his club in 2011. In April 2012, he joined KTP on loan until August, but he returned to FC Inter already in June after having made 9 appearances for KTP. In December 2012, he extended his contract with FC Inter until end of 2014. For the 2015 season he joined SJK on a one-year contract and won the Finnish championship as second goalkeeper behind Mihkel Aksalu with one appearance during the season.

Koponen left Inter Turku for the second time, at the end of the 2018 season.

From spring 2019 he is a member of lithuanian FK Palanga. In summer 2019 he left FK Palanga. In August 2019, he then returned to his former club, TPS.

References

External links
 
 Jere Koponen profile at Veikkausliiga

1992 births
Living people
Finnish footballers
Finnish expatriate footballers
FC Inter Turku players
Seinäjoen Jalkapallokerho players
Veikkausliiga players
Kotkan Työväen Palloilijat players
Turun Palloseura footballers
FK Palanga players
A Lyga players
Kakkonen players
Association football goalkeepers
Finnish expatriate sportspeople in Lithuania
Expatriate footballers in Lithuania
Footballers from Turku